112 – Sie retten dein Leben (112 - They save your life) is a German soap opera. It has been broadcast since 25 August 2008.

Also Known As (AKA)

"112 - Életmentők" Hungary

"112 Emergency"	Australia (informal title)

See also
List of German television series

External links
 
 :de:112 – Sie retten dein Leben (Corresponding German article). 
 https://translate.google.com/translate?sl=auto&tl=en&js=n&prev=_t&hl=en&ie=UTF-8&layout=2&eotf=1&u=http%3A%2F%2Fde.wikipedia.org%2Fwiki%2F112_%E2%80%93_Sie_retten_dein_Leben (Google's machine translation of the above link).

German television soap operas
2008 German television series debuts
2009 German television series endings
Television shows set in North Rhine-Westphalia
German-language television shows
RTL (German TV channel) original programming